Amata polyxo is a moth of the family Erebidae. It was described by James Farish Malcolm Fawcett in 1918. It is found in Kenya.

References

 

Polyxo
Moths of Africa
Moths described in 1918